Aloysius is a given name.

Etymology 
It is a Latinisation of the names Alois, Louis, Lewis, Luis, Luigi, Ludwig, and other cognates (traditionally in Medieval Latin as Ludovicus or Chlodovechus), ultimately from Frankish *Hlūdawīg, from Proto-Germanic *Hlūdawīgą ("famous battle"). In the US, the name is rare, with fewer than 0.001% of babies receiving the name since the 1940s. Most of those were Roman Catholics.

People
Notable people with the name include:

Aloysius Ambrozic (1930–2011), Roman Catholic cardinal
Aloysius Bertrand (1807–1841), French Romantic poet, playwright, and journalist
Aloysius Gonzaga (1568–1591), Italian aristocrat and saint
James Augustine Aloysius Joyce (1882–1941), Irish novelist and poet
Joseph Aloisius Ratzinger (1927–2022), birth name of Pope Benedict XVI, who served as Pope from 2005 until 2013
Aloysius Lilius (1510–1576), Italian doctor, astronomer, philosopher and chronologist
Aloysius Schmitt (1909–1941), Roman Catholic priest
Aloysius Stepinac (1898–1960), Yugoslav Croat prelate
Aloysius Szymanski (1902–1956), given name for Baseball Hall of Famer Al Simmons
Aloysius Pang (1990–2019), Singaporean actor
Chathurartha Devadithya Gardiyawasam Lindamulage Roy Aloysius Felix de Silva (1937–2018), Sri Lankan Sinhala actor and director
James Farley (1888–1976), American politician whose given name was James Aloysius Farley
John Aloysius Fahey (1939–2001), American fingerstyle guitarist
Aloysius John Jordan (1906–1957), English rugby league footballer who played in the 1930s
Petrus Aloysius (1503–1547), Duke of Piacenza and illegitimate son of Pope Paul III
R. A. Lafferty (1914–2002), American science fiction and fantasy writer
Aloysius Pieris (born 1934), Sri Lankan Sinhala Jesuit priest
James Aloysius Carroll (1955–2016), Canadian actor
Aloysius Paulus Maria van Gaal (born 1951), given name for Dutch football manager Louis van Gaal
Patrick Aloysius Ewing (born 1962), Jamaican-American retired Hall of Fame basketball player
Thomas Aloysius Keller (born 1955), American chef and restaurateur
Joseph Aloysius Wambaugh, Jr (born 1937), best-selling American writer
Aloysius John Wycisło (1908–2005), American prelate of the Roman Catholic Church who served as the eighth bishop of the Diocese of Green Bay
Declan Patrick Aloysius McManus (born 1954), English musician otherwise known as Elvis Costello
Januarius Aloysius MacGahan (1844–1878), Irish-American journalist and war correspondent

Fictional characters
Aloysius, in Evelyn Waugh's 1945 novel Brideshead Revisited.
Aloysius Creevey, character in the show Skins.
Aloysius Hands, character in Rafael Bernal’s 1946 novella, The Strange Case of Aloysius Hands.
Aloysius McGillicuddy, putative inventor of Fireball Cinnamon Whisky.
Aloysius Nell, a police office and character in the Stephen King novel It.
Aloysius Parker, the chauffeur of Lady Penelope Creighton-Ward in the 1960s TV series Thunderbirds.
Aloysius Pendergast, protagonist of several novels by Douglas Preston and Lincoln Child.
Aloysius K. Randall, protagonist in the war film Wake Island (film)
Aloysius Snuffleupagus ("Mr. Snuffleupagus") of Sesame Street.
Lynn Aloysius Belvedere ("Mr. Belvedere").
Timothy Aloysius Cadwallader "Dum Dum" Dugan, a fictional character in the Marvel Universe.
Pee-Wee Aloysius Herman, Pee Wee's Playhouse.
Sister Aloysius, principal of the school in the play Doubt: A Parable.
Aloysius O’Hare, mayor of Thneedville and antagonist in the 2012 film The Lorax.
Aloysius Devadander Abercrombie, narrator of the Primus song "My Name is Mud".
Aloysius Pig, a character in the seventh season of Garfield and Friends.
Bartholomew "Barry" Aloysius Dylan, a recurring antagonist of the show Archer
Aloysius Castleroy, Lord Castleroy in Reign.
Hunter Aloysius Percy, character in the Netflix series The OA.
Owlowiscious, Twilight Sparkle's pet owl in My Little Pony.
Aloysius T. McKeever, hobo squatter in It Happened on Fifth Avenue (1947).
Aloysius Gogarty, Mrs. Random's gardener in Bringing Up Baby (1938).
Aloysius, an anthropomorphic wolf who would get into a situation and have to be rescued by the other characters in the story.
Aloysius III, character from Cartoon Network miniseries Infinity Train
Aloysius Samberly, recurring character on Agent Carter
Theodore Aloysius McGriff, character from Nickelodeon series Hey Dude.

Education
St Aloysius' College

Notes

Masculine given names